Swami Vivekananda Mahavidyalaya, established in 2012, is a general degree college in Mohanpur,  West Tripura district, Tripura. It offers undergraduate courses in arts and sciences. It is affiliated to  Tripura University. 
The college is recognized by the University Grants Commission (UGC).

See also
Education in India
Education in Tripura
Tripura University
Swami Vivekananda
Literacy in India
List of institutions of higher education in Tripura

References

External links

Colleges affiliated to Tripura University
Educational institutions established in 2012
Universities and colleges in Tripura
2012 establishments in Tripura
Colleges in Tripura